Unstuck in Time is Jughead's Revenge's first studio album, released in 1990. It was re-released by BYO Records in 1995 as the second half of the CD that also included the band's second album, It's Lonely at the Bottom. It is titled It's Lonely at the Bottom/Unstuck in Time.

Track listing
 "Jughead's Revenge"
 "Unstuck in Time"
 "Failure at Life"
 "State of the World"
 "Fuck Shit Up"
 "Formula 502"
 "Pack Your Bags"
 "Memories Of You"
 "My Problems"
 "Face of Destruction"
 "Not My House"
 "Sentenced to Die"

Personnel
 Joe Doherty − vocals
 Joey Rimicci − guitar
 George Snow − guitar
 Brian Preiss − bass
 Nenus Givargus − drums

1990 debut albums
Jughead's Revenge albums